Mass No. 3 may refer to:

 Mass No. 3 (Bruckner), in F minor, by Anton Bruckner
 Mass No. 3 (Haydn), Missa Cellensis in C major,  by Joseph Haydn
 Mass No. 3 (Mozart), Dominicus in D minor, by Wolfgang Amadeus Mozart
 Mass No. 3 (Schubert), in B-flat major, by Franz Schubert